Pattanagere is a metro station on the Purple Line of the Namma Metro serving the RV College of Engineering and to the north is Jnanabharathi metro station and to the south is the suburbs of Kengeri along with the Kengeri Metro station. It was inaugurated on 29 August 2021 and commenced to the public on 30 August 2021.

Station layout

Entry/Exits
There are 3 Entry/Exit points – A, B and C. Commuters can use either of the points for their travel.

 Entry/Exit point A: Towards RV College of Engineering side
 Entry/Exit point B: Towards Duvasapalya Road side
 Entry/Exit point C: Towards Kengeri Bus Terminal side

See also 

 Bangalore
 List of Namma Metro stations
 Transport in Karnataka
 List of metro systems
 List of rapid transit systems in India
 Bangalore portal

References 



Namma Metro stations